Markham Wildman (born 25 January 1936) is an English retired professional snooker and English billiards player and cue sports commentator. He won the World Professional Billiards Championship in 1984, and was runner up in 1980 and 1982. He made a televised snooker century break in 1960.

Biography
Wildman was born on 25 January 1936. He was the British under-16 champion of English billiards in 1951, and the British under-19 winner in 1952 and 1953. He was also the 1952 British Boys Champion in snooker, and British Junior snooker champion in 1954. In 1968, he won the English Amateur Billiards Championship by defeating Clive Everton 2,652–2,540 in the final. Following his national service in the Royal Air Force, Wildman worked in finance, and was later an area manager for United Dominions Trust. In 1960, he compiled a televised snooker century break.

He applied to become a professional player in 1979, and was initially rejected by the World Professional Billiards and Snooker Association (WPBSA), before being accepted later that year. In his first match as a professional, he lost 7–9 to Frank Jonik in the qualifying competition for the 1980 World Snooker Championship.

He reached the final of the 1980 World Professional Billiards Championship by defeating Bernard Bennett, Rex Williams and Ray Edmonds, and was runner-up to Fred Davis with a scoreline of 2,064–3,037.

In the 1982 World Billiards Championship, he was runner-up to Williams. The 1984 UK Open Billiards Championship was his first major title win as a professional, secured when he defeated Davis 1,500–1,032 in the final. During the semi-final, against Williams, he recorded a break of 495, his highest. He won the Professional Billiards title in 1984, narrowly defeating Charlton 1,045–1,012 in the five-hour final.

He defeated three top-16 players, John Virgo, Silvino Francisco, and Charlton, to reach the semi-finals of the 1984 Lada Classic, where he was eliminated 3–5 by Tony Meo, and lost to Terry Griffiths, 8–10, in the first round of the 1984 World Snooker Championship. He retired from professional snooker in 1991, but continued to play professional billiards for several years. The highest ranking position he attained was 21st, in the 1984–85 snooker world rankings.

Throughout the 1980s and early 1990s, Wildman was a snooker commentator for ITV until snooker was dropped by the channel in 1993.

He was a WPBSA director from 1984 to 1991, and for another term ending in 1997. From September 1999 to 4 December 2001 he served as WPBSA Chairman, then had a further term on the board from 17 December 2001 until September 2002.

Career finals (English billiards)
These World Professional Billiards Championships were held on a knockout basis, organised by the WPBSA.

References

1936 births
Living people
English players of English billiards
English snooker players
Snooker writers and broadcasters
Snooker coaches, managers and promoters
Pool writers and broadcasters
World champions in English billiards